Konstantin Pavlovich Khokhlov (1 November 1885 – 1 January 1956) was a Soviet stage and film actor, theater director, teacher. People's Artist of the USSR (1944).

Selected filmography 
 1918 — Be Silent, My Sorrow, Be Silent
 1927 — The Club of the Big Deed
 1932 — Horizon
 1933 — The Great Consoler
 1936 — Journey to Arzrum

References

External links 
 Konstantin Khokhlov on kino-teatr.ru

Soviet male film actors
20th-century Russian male actors
1885 births
1956 deaths
Soviet theatre directors
Russian male film actors
Soviet male stage actors
Russian male stage actors
Recipients of the Order of Lenin
People's Artists of the USSR
Male   actors from Moscow
Russian drama teachers
Soviet drama teachers